Cheng Xunzhao (born  9 February 1991) is a Chinese judoka. He represented his country at the 2016 Summer Olympics.

References

External links
 
 
 

1991 births
Living people
Chinese male judoka
Judoka at the 2016 Summer Olympics
Olympic judoka of China
2016 Olympic bronze medalists for China
Olympic medalists in judo
Judoka at the 2014 Asian Games
People from Feng County, Jiangsu
Sportspeople from Xuzhou
Asian Games competitors for China
21st-century Chinese people